Westfield Chatswood  is a large indoor shopping centre in the suburb of Chatswood in the Lower North Shore of Sydney.

Transport
The Metro North West and North Shore and Northern Line offer frequent services to Chatswood station which is a short walk from the centre.

Westfield Chatswood has bus connections operated by Busways, Forest Coach Lines, Keolis Downer Northern Beaches services to the Sydney CBD, North Shore and Northern Sydney, as well as surrounding suburbs with bus stops on Victoria Avenue.

Westfield Chatswood also has a multi level car park with 2,831 spaces.

History
Westfield Chatswood opened on 30 January 1986 and is the second major shopping centre to be built in Chatswood with the first being Chatswood Chase in 1983 and Wallace Way and Lemon Grove in the 1980s. The centre was located next to the free standing Grace Bros store that opened in 1961 and featured Target (which was originally located at Wallace Way until 1986), Coles New World and Franklins (closed 2001 and renamed Food For Less). In 1999 it was redeveloped to incorporate a previously free standing Grace Bros store (later renamed Myer in 2004) and Toys "R" Us was added.

In 2008 Aldi opened its store on the space vacated by Food For Less. Spanish clothing retailer Zara opened its store on 13 February 2014.

In July 2014, as part of a restructure of the Westfield Group, it came under the control of the Scentre Group.

Recent development 
In 2015 a $110 million upgrade to Westfield Chatswood commenced, with the centre increased from 77,000sqm to 80,000sqm of gross lettable area. The redevelopment was completed in November 2015 with H&M (opened on the space vacated by Toys "R" Us), Uniqlo, Mecca Maxima and a new relocated Rebel Sport all opened on 18 February 2016.

This development consists of: 
 Forty new stores 
 Four new international fashion stores, as well as some local fashion stores (including Sydney's third H&M, Uniqlo, Topshop and Topman)
 Two-level entrance on Victoria Avenue reconfigured into a five-level mall which included a two-level flagship Topshop and Topman (as of September 2017 the store is now closed) 
 Hawker Lane Asian dining restaurants precinct
 A reduced regular food court

Tenants 
Westfield Chatswood has 81,093m² of floor space. The major retailers include Myer, Target, Aldi, Coles, Uniqlo, Zara, JB Hi-Fi, Rebel, Timezone (previously known as PLAYTIME) and Hoyts Cinema.

Incidents and accidents 
 24 September 2005, a 32-year-old woman fell from the sixth floor and straight onto a 42-year-old woman on the ground floor in an attempted suicide. Both women were taken to Royal North Shore Hospital and police are investigating.
 12 January 2016, A man fell from the fifth level and died. About 3:45 pm police were called to the centre following reports a man was standing on the wrong side of a railing. Police believe it was suicide.

References

External links
 Westfield Chatswood Official Website

Westfield Group
Shopping centres in Sydney
Shopping malls established in 1986
1986 establishments in Australia
Chatswood, New South Wales